Sam Shepard was an American actor, screenwriter, playwright, director and author. The following is his screen filmography as an actor, screenwriter, and director. Shepard was nominated for the Academy Award for Best Supporting Actor for his role as Chuck Yeager in the film The Right Stuff (1983). The following year, he was nominated for the BAFTA Award for Best Adapted Screenplay for co-writing Paris, Texas (1984). For his role in the television film Dash and Lilly (1999), he was nominated for the Primetime Emmy Award for Outstanding Lead Actor in a Miniseries or a Movie and the Golden Globe Award for Best Actor – Miniseries or Television Film.

As actor

Film

Television

As writer

Film

Television

See also
 List of awards and nominations received by Sam Shepard

References
 
 
 
 

Male actor filmographies
American filmographies